Girard Township may refer to the following places in the United States:

 Girard Township, Macoupin County, Illinois
 Girard Township, Michigan
 Girard Township, Erie County, Pennsylvania
 Girard Township, Clearfield County, Pennsylvania
 Girard Township, Otter Tail County, Minnesota

Township name disambiguation pages